This is a list of animated television series first aired in 1994.

Anime television series first aired in 1994

See also
 List of animated feature films of 1994
 List of Japanese animation television series of 1994

References

Television series
Animated series
1994
1994
1994-related lists